"These Are Days" is a song by alternative rock group 10,000 Maniacs, released as the lead single from their 1992 album, Our Time in Eden. The song reached  1 on the US Billboard Modern Rock Tracks chart in November 1992. They also performed the song for their 1993 album, MTV Unplugged, and it appears on their 2016 live album, Playing Favorites, with lead vocalist Mary Ramsey.

Track listing

Charts

See also
 Number one modern rock hits of 1992

References

1992 singles
1992 songs
10,000 Maniacs songs
Elektra Records singles
Songs written by Natalie Merchant